Middle America is a subregion in the middle latitudes of the Americas. It usually includes Mexico, the 7 countries of Central America, and the 13 island countries and 18 territories of the Caribbean. Together with Northern America, they form the continent of North America.

Colombia and Venezuela of South America are sometimes included in this subregion. The Caribbean is occasionally excluded from this subregion while Bermuda and The Guianas are infrequently included.

Geography 

Physiographically, Middle America marks the territorial transition between Northern America and South America, connecting yet separating the two. On the west, the Middle American mainland comprises the tapering, isthmian tract of the American landmass between the southern Rocky Mountains in the southern United States and the northern tip of the Andes in Colombia, separating the Pacific Ocean on the west and the Atlantic Ocean (viz. the Gulf of Mexico and Caribbean Sea) on the east, while the Greater and Lesser Antilles form an island arc in the east. The region developed subaerially southward from North America as a complex volcanic arc-trench system during the Early Cretaceous period, eventually forming the land bridge during the Pliocene epoch when its southern end (at Panama) collided with South America through tectonic action.

Countries and territories 
Small island nations are excluded. Puerto Rico is in italics due to not being independent.

Use of the term Middle America as synonym 
Occasionally, the term Middle America is used synonymously with Central America (compare with Middle Africa and Central Africa). In English, the term is uncommonly used as a synonym of the term Mesoamerica (or Meso-America), which generally refers to an ancient culture region situated in Middle America extending roughly from central Mexico to northern Costa Rica. In addition, some residents of the region (e.g., Costa Ricans and Nicaraguans) may be referred to as Meso-Americans or Central Americans, but not, however, as Middle Americans, which refers to a particular constituency in the United States.

See also 

 Americas (terminology)
 Aridoamerica
 Latin America and the Caribbean
 Middle America Trench
 Oasisamerica
 Southern Cone
 West Indies

Notes

References

Citations

Sources 
 
 "Middle America", Dictionary.com.
 "North America". The Columbia Encyclopedia, 6th ed. 2001–6. New York: Columbia University Press.
 Oxford English Reference Dictionary, 2nd ed. (rev.) 2002. Oxford, UK: Oxford University Press.